Luis Fernando Camargo Flechas (born December 17, 1977) is a Colombian road racing cyclist, who is currently suspended from the sport. He is nicknamed "Tenorio".

Major results

2005
 1st Stage 10 Vuelta a Colombia
2007
 1st Stage 4 Vuelta a Colombia
2008
 1st Overall Vuelta a Boyacà
 1st Overall Vuelta a Bolivia
1st Stage 8a (ITT)
 1st Stage 7 Clásico RCN
2009
 1st Overall Vuelta al Ecuador
1st Stage 3
 10th Overall Vuelta a Colombia
2010
 3rd Overall Doble Sucre Potosí GP Cemento Fancesa
 7th Overall Vuelta al Ecuador
2011
 5th Overall Vuelta Ciclista a Costa Rica
2012
 6th Overall Vuelta a Colombia
1st  Mountains classification
1st Stages 9 & 11 (ITT)
2014
 2nd Overall Vuelta a Colombia
1st Stage 9

References

External links

 

1977 births
Living people
Colombian male cyclists
Vuelta a Colombia stage winners
Sportspeople from Boyacá Department
21st-century Colombian people